Aldrichia ehrmanii is a species of bee flies (insects in the family Bombyliidae).

References

External links

 

Bombyliidae
Articles created by Qbugbot
Insects described in 1894
Taxa named by Daniel William Coquillett